Maharani Divya Singh (born 6 November 1963) is an Indian politician and former member of the Lok Sabha, the lower house of Indian parliament. She was elected in the Bharatpur constituency in Rajasthan, running as a candidate for Bhartiya Janta Party.

Early life
Divya was born on 6 November 1963, in Lucknow, Uttar Pradesh. On 15 February 1989, she married Maharaj Vishvendra Singh.

Education & Career
Divya received a Bachelor of Arts from Isabella Thoburn College.
Divya became a member of the Bharatpur district council in 1996. Later, she was elected to the 11th Lok Sabha.
In 2012, Divya resigned as member of the Rajasthan Public Service Commission to which she had been appointed in 2011, citing personal reasons.

References

India MPs 1996–1997
Bharatiya Janata Party politicians from Rajasthan
Articles created or expanded during Women's History Month (India) - 2014
1963 births
Living people
Women in Rajasthan politics
20th-century Indian women politicians
20th-century Indian politicians
Lok Sabha members from Rajasthan
Politicians from Lucknow
People from Bharatpur district
Rajasthan district councillors
People from Bharatpur, Rajasthan